George Howells Broadhurst (June 3, 1866 – January 31, 1952) was an Anglo-American theatre owner/manager, director, producer and playwright.  His plays were most popular from the late 1890s into the 1920s.

Biography
Broadhurst was born in Walsall, England, in 1866.  In 1882 he emigrated to the United States where, while working for the Chicago Board of Trade, he began writing plays, the first of which, The Speculator, was based on his work there.  He later moved into production and direction.

He also managed theatres in Milwaukee, Baltimore, and San Francisco, and in 1917 in partnership with the Shubert brothers he built and opened the famous Broadhurst Theatre in New York. He staged a number of plays in his eponymous theatre until 1924, and continued to co-own the theatre with the Shuberts until his death in 1952.  He was survived by his wife, director and playwright Lillian Trimble Bradley.

Broadhurst and his wife lived in Santa Barbara, California for the last ten years of his life, and he is buried there.

Works
Broadhurst wrote almost 30 plays, including the farces What Happened to Jones (1897), The Wrong Mr. Wright (1897), and Why Smith Left Home (1899) (all of which did better in London than in New York),  and plays The Man of the Hour (1906), Bought and Paid For (1911), The Law of the Land (1914), and The Crimson Alibi (1919).

His work was once described as one "who had a knack for the sort of melodrama that poses as a serious study of morals."

References

External links

 
 
 

American theatre managers and producers
American dramatists and playwrights
English emigrants to the United States
People from Walsall
1866 births
1952 deaths